DQS Holding GmbH based in Frankfurt am Main is the holding company of the worldwide DQS Group. The group provides assessments and certifications of management systems and processes of any type.

History 
DQS was founded in 1985 in Berlin and was the first German certification body. The aim of the founding partners, DGQ (German Society for Quality) and DIN (German Institute for Standardization), was mainly to promote the German economy. The foundation overlapped with the publication of the first drafts of the ISO 9000 series of standards, which also include the most important quality standard worldwide today: ISO 9001.

In 1986 DQS became the first certification body in Germany to issue a certificate according to ISO 9001.

After the merger of DQS with the Management Systems Solutions (MSS) division of the American product certification body Underwriters Laboratories Inc. in March 2008, DQS-UL Group is currently one of the world's largest system certification bodies. Since June 2015 the company changed its name to DQS Group.

Corporate Organization 
DQS Holding GmbH has more than 85 offices in over 60 countries. DQS Group currently has about 20,000 certified customers across almost all industries with approximately 65,000 certified locations in over 130 countries.

The concern employs 814 people and commands 2,500 auditors in 2019 (annual average). Among the largest companies within the group are DQS India.(Bangalore), DQS Inc. (USA), DQS do Brasil Ltd., DQS Japan Inc., DQS Medizinprodukte GmbH (Medical Devices), DQS CFS (sustainability) and DQS GmbH (all Germany).

DQS India

Headquartered in Bangalore Main and with a local offices in Chennai, Pune, Gujarat, DQS India is the largest subsidiary of DQS Holding GmbH. In 2018 DQS India launched DQS NXT https://dqs-nxt.com which is designed or built to make the Audit process automation to cope up with industry 4.O requirements. DQS intends to keep adding products under this 4.0, we start with Audit Organiser 4.0 and Supplier Audit Management 4.0.

1.Audit Organiser 4.0 - Manage a wide range of audit-related activities, data and processes in a single, comprehensive framework. It provides the flexibility to support all types of audits – internal and external including management system, process, product and customer specific audits respectively.

2.Supplier Audit Management 4.0 - A comprehensive web application that helps organisations to manage the whole array of activities, processes and data related to supplier audits. It aids the management to decide appropriate interventions to optimize the effort and develop suppliers in line with their strategic intent

DQS GmbH in Germany

Headquartered in Frankfurt am Main and with a local offices in Hamburg, DQS GmbH is the largest subsidiary of DQS Holding GmbH.

Service spectrum 
The group’s services include cross-industry assessments to customer or industry-specific requirements and certifications to national and international standards and specifications.

 ISO 9001 (Quality)
 ISO 14001 (Environment)
 ISO 45001 (Workplace safety)
 IATF 16949 (Automotive)
 ISO 22301 (Business Continuity)
 ISO 27001 (Information security)
 ISO 28000 (Security Management System for the Supply Chain)
 ISO 37001 (Anti-Bribery Management Systems)
 ISO 50001 (Energy management)
 ISO 13485 (Medical Device certification)
 ISO/TS 22163:2017/IRIS (Rail sector)
 EN 9100:2018 series (Aerospace)
 International Featured Standard (IFS)
 FSSC 22000
 GRI

In addition, the group also offers assessments in the areas of Risk Management Systems, Sustainability, Education, Data Privacy, Business Excellence, Health and Social Services, and Integrated Management Systems.

Network 
DQS is a charter and full member of the international certification network IQNet Association which was founded in 1990. The main objective of the currently approx. 40-member global network is the mutual recognition of certificates issued by the member companies. Dr Sied Sadek, Managing Director of DQS CFS and DQS Middle East, pointed out in an interview to share DQS's expertise in the field of CSR reporting and DQS's understanding of the necessity to do so sensitive to the regional and cultural context, in the development process of the Islamic Reporting Initiative (IRI).

References

External links 
2008 Merger between DQS and the Management Systems Solutions Division of Underwriters Laboratories Inc. 
Website of DQS. 
Website of DQS HK. 
Website of DQS HK in Chinese. 

Certificate authorities
Certification marks
Environmental certification marks
Quality management
Standards organisations in Germany
Multinational companies
Companies based in Frankfurt
Companies established in 1985
1985 establishments in West Germany